The mayor of Navotas is the head of the executive branch of the Navotas's government. The mayor holds office at Navotas City Hall. Like all local government heads in the Philippines, the mayor is elected via popular vote, and may not be elected for a fourth consecutive term (although the former mayor may return to office after an interval of one term). In case of death, resignation or incapacity, the vice mayor becomes the mayor.

Latest election

List of leaders

From 1859 to 1898, Navotas was led by sixteen (16) governadorcillos

List of governadorcillos (1859-1898)

 1. Mariano Israel - 1859-1860
 2. Baldomero Cacnio - 1861-1873-1874 / 1881-1882/1885-1886
 3. Jose Mariano Oliveros - 1862
 4. Andres Pascual - 1863
 5. Juan Sioson  - 1864-1865
 6. Miguel Oliveros - 1866-1867
 7. Francisco Oliveros - 1868-1869
 8. Eduardo Suarez - 1869-1870
 9. Pedro Naval - 1871-1872
 10. Natalio Cruz - 1875-1876
 11. Domingo Tiangco - 1877-1878
 12. Domingo Reyes - 1879-1880 / 1888-1889
 13. Cipriano L. San Pedro - 1883-1884
 14. Mariano Laiz Oliveros- 1887-1888
 15. Mariano Naval - 1890-1891
 16. Mateo de Vera - 1892-1898

During the period of the Philippine Commonwealth (from 1935-1945), the 1935 constitution ushered. 
This provided that the President  of the Philippines should exercise general supervision over all local 
governments. This allowed Navotas to have three (3) leaders.
This trend from 1946 to 1972 (during the second Philippine Republic) was toward decentralization. 
Congress passed laws giving more autonomy to Local Government Units through the grant of additional powers 
and lessening of national control affairs. This created four (4) Mayors of Navotas.
During the Martial Law Period, President Marcos had changed the structure and functions of LGU’s, thus 
decentralization suffered the set back with the concentration of power on his hands. After December 31, 1975 
(expiration of tenure of office of the local elective officials), the President assumed the power of appointment of 
the officials as authorized by the people in a referendum held on 27 February 1975. During the Marcos Regime, 
Navotas had two (2) Mayors.

List

Vice Mayor of Navotas
The Vice Mayor is the second-highest official of the city. The vice mayor is elected via popular vote; although most mayoral candidates have running mates, the vice mayor is elected separately from the mayor. This can result in the mayor and the vice mayor coming from different political parties.

The Vice Mayor is the presiding officer of the Navotas City Council, although he can only vote as the tiebreaker. When a mayor is removed from office, the vice mayor becomes the mayor until the scheduled next election. The incumbent is Tito Sanchez.

See also
Navotas

References

 
Navotas
Navotas